Lucy Wilkins is an English violinist and keyboardist from Nottingham, England.  She has toured with Roxy Music and performed with James Blunt and Snow Patrol.  She has received critical acclaim for her violin solos while touring with Roxy Music. According to a concert review of the band in The New York Times, "Wilkins succeeded in the difficult role of synthesizer wizard, originally held by the legendary Brian Eno." Wilkins has performed in concerts with the influential EMS VCS 3 synthesizer, as used by Eno and others.

References

1970s births
Living people
People from Nottingham
English violinists
English rock keyboardists